This is a list of settlements in Essex by population based on the results of the 2011 census. The next United Kingdom census will take place in 2021. In 2011, there were 44 built-up area subdivisions with 5,000 or more inhabitants in Essex, shown in the table below.

Population ranking

References 

Essex
 
Essex